Barbara Bond (born August 9, 1962) is an American former rugby union player. They defeated  19-6 in the final to claim the 1991 World Cup. She also participated at the 1994, and 1998 Women's Rugby World Cup.

Life 
She graduated from Reed College.

References

External links 
 https://www.usarugby.org/player/barb-bond/
https://www.goffrugbyreport.com/news/25-years-ago-march-top-began
http://scrumhalfconnection.com/2016/04/15/91-usa-rugby-womens-rugby-world-cup-winners-honored/

Living people
United States women's international rugby union players
American female rugby union players
Female rugby union players
1962 births
21st-century American women